Carrot River 29A is an Indian reserve of the Red Earth Cree Nation in Saskatchewan. It is 48 miles east of Nipawin. In the 2016 Canadian Census, it recorded a population of 829 living in 127 of its 127 total private dwellings. In the same year, its Community Well-Being index was calculated at 40 of 100, compared to 58.4 for the average First Nations community and 77.5 for the average non-Indigenous community.

References

Indian reserves in Saskatchewan
Division No. 14, Saskatchewan